Commander Richard Wainwright (January 15, 1817 – August 10, 1862) was an officer in the United States Navy during the American Civil War who commanded , flagship of Admiral David G. Farragut's West Gulf Blockading Squadron.

Early life
Wainwright was born in Charlestown, Massachusetts on January 15, 1817. He was the son of Robert Dewar Wainwright and Maria Montresor Auchmuty.  He was a cousin of Comdr. Jonathan Mayhew Wainwright.

Career
Wainwright was commissioned in the United States Navy on 11 May 1831. He attended the naval school at Norfolk, Virginia in 1837-38, and became a passed midshipman on 15 June 1837. From 1838 to 1841, he served on the United States Coast Survey in the brig Consort. He was commissioned lieutenant on 8 September 1841 and commanded the steamer  on the Navy's Home Squadron from 1848 to 1849, served again on U.S. Coast Survey duty from 1851 to 1857, and cruised in the steam frigate  on special service from 1857 to 1860. He was stationed at the Washington Navy Yard on ordnance duty from 1860 to 1861.

Following the outbreak of the Civil War, Wainwright was promoted to commander on 24 April 1861 and commanded , flagship of Admiral David G. Farragut's West Gulf Blockading Squadron. During the passage of the forts below New Orleans, Louisiana on the night of 24 and 25 April 1862, he performed gallant service in extinguishing a fire on Hartford while continuing the bombardment of the forts. Commended by Admiral Farragut for his actions, Wainwright later participated in the squadron's operations below Vicksburg until taken ill with fever.

Personal life
On March 1, 1849, he married Sarah "Sally" Franklin Bache (1824–1880) in Philadelphia, Pennsylvania.  She was the daughter of Sophia Burrell (née Dallas) Bache and Richard Bache, Jr., who served in the Republic of Texas navy and was elected to the Texas state legislature.  Her maternal grandparents were Arabella Maria Smith and Alexander J. Dallas, an American statesman who served as the U.S. Treasury Secretary under President James Madison. She was the paternal granddaughter of Sarah (née Franklin) Bache and Richard Bache, and the great-granddaughter of Benjamin Franklin.  Together, they were the parents of:

 Richard Wainwright, who was a naval officer in the Spanish–American War. 
 Dallas Bache Wainwright, who was an officer with the U.S. Coast and Geodetic Survey.
 Maria Campbell Wainwright, who married Adm. Seaton Schroeder.

Legacy
Three ships have been named  for Richard, his cousins, son and grandson.

References
Notes;

Sources
 
 

1817 births
1862 deaths
Richard
United States Navy officers
People of Massachusetts in the American Civil War
American people of English descent
Franklin family
Union Navy officers